Buloburde, also spelled Buloburti or Bulobarde, is a city in Somalia's central Hiran region.

Overview
Buloburde is situated along the Shabelle River, near Jalalaqsi. It is the center of the Buloburde District.

In March 2014, Somali Armed Forces, assisted by AMISOM troops, captured the town from Al-Shabaab. The offensive was part of an intensified military operation by the allied forces to remove the insurgent group from the remaining areas in southern Somalia under its control.

Demographics
Buloburde has a population of around 20,500. The broader Buloburde District has a population of 210,120.

Notes

Populated places in Hiran, Somalia